
This is an incomplete list of more recent recorded major earthquakes that have occurred within the boundaries of Indonesia. The determinants of the activity are indicated by the geology of the region, and the volcanic activity.

Large numbers of earthquakes of smaller magnitude occur very regularly due to the meeting of major tectonic plates in the region. Based on the records of the USGS, Indonesia has had more than 150 earthquakes with magnitude > 7 in the period 1901–2019.

Earthquakes

2000–present

1900-1999

1629-1899

See also 
 Eurasian Plate
 Geology of Indonesia
 Indo-Australian Plate
 Krakatoa
 List of faults in Indonesia
 List of historical earthquakes
 List of natural disasters in Indonesia
 List of tsunamis affecting Indonesia
 List of volcanoes in Indonesia
 Seismicity of the Sumatra coast

References

Sources

Further reading

External links 

 Hayes, G.P. et al. 2013, Seismicity of the Earth 1900–2012 Sumatra and vicinity: USGS Open-File Report 2010–1083-L, scale 1:6,000,000
 Jones, E.S. et al. 2014, Seismicity of the Earth 1900–2012 Java and vicinity: USGS Open-File Report 2010–1083-N, 1 sheet, scale 1:5,000,000, Seismicity of the Earth 1900–2012 Java and vicinity 
 Benz, H.M. et al. 2011, Seismicity of the Earth 1900–2010 New Guinea and vicinity: USGS Open-File Report 2010–1083-H, scale 1:8,000,000.
 

 
Indonesia
Tsunamis in Indonesia
Earthquakes